Daltopora felixi is a moth of the family Gelechiidae. It was described by Povolný in 1979. It is found in Mongolia.

The length of the forewings is 5.3-6.2 mm for males and about 4 mm for females. The forewings are blackish coffee-brown with a broad white streak along the outer margin. The hindwings are thinly sprinkled with greyish scales.

References

Moths described in 1979
Isophrictini